The 2007 Esiliiga is the 17th season of the Esiliiga, second-highest Estonian league for association football clubs, since its establishment in 1992.

JK Sillamäe Kalev gained automatic promotion to the Meistriliiga as FC Levadia II are the reserve team for Meistriliiga champions FC Levadia and therefore can not be promoted to the same league as its parent club. JK Nõmme Kalju also go up after winning the promotion-relegation play-off.
The league's top-scorer was Andrus Mitt from JK Nõmme Kalju with 24 goals.

Final table of Esiliiga season 2007

Season statistics

Top goalscorers
As of 11 November 2007.

See also
 2007 Meistriliiga

References

Esiliiga seasons
2
Estonia
Estonia